The Tampa Rockets were a baseball team that played in the Florida State Negro League in the 1940s. Notable players that played for the Rockets include Walter Lee Gibbons and Raydell "Bo" Maddix. Both of them went on to play for the Indianapolis Clowns of the Negro American League.

References 

Baseball in Florida
Negro league baseball teams
Sports teams in Tampa, Florida
Defunct baseball teams in Florida
Baseball teams disestablished in 1947
Baseball teams established in 1942